Michael R. Kanost (born 1956; Cheyenne, Wyoming) is a University Distinguished Professor in the Department of Biochemistry and Molecular Biophysics at Kansas State University.

Early life and education
Kanost was born in 1956 in Cheyenne, Wyoming. His interest in general science started in grade school, in Cheyenne and continued in junior high and high school after his family moved to Broomfield, Colorado in 1968. In 1975 Kanost enrolled in Colorado State University from which he graduated in 1979 with a B.S. in zoology and entomology. In 1983 Kanost received his Ph.D. in entomology from Purdue University after being mentored by Peter Dunn there. While at Purdue, the duo studied pathogenic bacteria of Manduca sexta and how infections stimulate synthesis of hemolymph antibacterial proteins.

Career
Following the dissertation, Kanost became a postdoc in the Department of Biology at Queen's University in Kingston, Ontario. There he worked with Prof. G.R. Wyatt and helped him study protein synthesis stimulated by juvenile hormone and insect hemolymph proteins. In 1986, Kanost moved to the University of Arizona's Department of Biochemistry, where he worked with Prof. Michael Wells.

From 1986 to 1991 Kanost was a Research Associate and later Research Assistant Professor at UA, studying lipophorin and serpins in insect hemolymph. In 1991, Kanost became Assistant Professor of Biochemistry at Kansas State University, and in 2005 he was promoted to University Distinguished Professor. He also served as head of the Department from 2002 to 2012.

Research
In 2005 Kanost was a member of a small research team that suggested that silencing the enzyme laccase-2 in a beetle prevents cuticle tanning, the process of hardening and pigmenting the insect's exoskeleton. The research suggests that understanding the exoskeleton's chemistry may also lead to development of new strategies for pest control or for development of lightweight and strong materials.  

In 2016, he led an effort to sequence and annotate the Manduca sexta genome.

Personal life
Since 1977, Michael Kanost is married to Jill, and is a father to four children. When he is not at his desk studying insects, Kanost is playing the cello with the Salina (Kansas) Symphony and growing tomatoes.

Awards
Fellow of the American Association for the Advancement of Science (2003)
Fellow of the Entomological Society of America (2015)

References

External links

Michael Kanost on Kansas State University site

1956 births
Living people
Colorado State University alumni
Purdue University alumni
University of Arizona faculty
Kansas State University faculty
People from Cheyenne, Wyoming
Fellows of the American Association for the Advancement of Science
Fellows of the Entomological Society of America
People from Broomfield, Colorado